Rinat Mukhin (born 29 January 1994) is a Kazakhstani cross-country skier. 

He represented Kazakhstan at the FIS Nordic World Ski Championships 2015 in Falun.

References

External links 
 

1994 births
Living people
Kazakhstani male cross-country skiers
Cross-country skiers at the 2017 Asian Winter Games
Asian Games medalists in cross-country skiing
Asian Games gold medalists for Kazakhstan
Asian Games silver medalists for Kazakhstan
Medalists at the 2017 Asian Winter Games
Competitors at the 2017 Winter Universiade
Universiade silver medalists for Kazakhstan
Universiade medalists in cross-country skiing